John Plumptre (10 February 1711 – 23 February 1791), British politician, was the first son of John Plumptre and Arabella Molyneux.

He married twice:
Margaret Bridges (d. 8 Jan. 1756) on 12 Sep 1750, daughter of Sir Brook Bridges, 2nd Baronet, sister of Sir Brook Bridges, 3rd Baronet.
Mary Glover, on 14 Sep 1758, daughter of Philips Glover of Wispington, Lincolnshire.

He entered Parliament as Member of Parliament (MP) for Member for Penryn in 1758.

He was appointed Commissioner of Stamps in 1739, and held this position until November 1753.

He lived at Plumptre House, Nottingham.

References

1711 births
1791 deaths
Members of the Parliament of Great Britain for English constituencies
British MPs 1754–1761
British MPs 1761–1768
British MPs 1768–1774